White Chalk is the seventh studio album by English singer-songwriter and musician PJ Harvey, released on 24 September 2007 on Island Records.

Work on the album started in 2006, with producer Flood and John Parish, who also worked on her To Bring You My Love and Is This Desire? albums. Other collaborators on White Chalk are Eric Drew Feldman and Jim White from Dirty Three.

The first single released from White Chalk was "When Under Ether" on 17 September 2007 on digital download and 7" vinyl. A second single, "The Piano," was released on 26 November 2007. A third, "The Devil," was released on 7", download, and CD formats in March 2008.

Style
The previous album, Uh Huh Her, had a raw sound but for this record White Chalk, Rolling Stones magazine noted that Harvey "delved further into a Goth-like vibe in the much quieter, haunting, piano-based music". For this album she gave up the traditional three-piece sound guitar/bass/drums and recorded a set of songs for piano, despite her lack of expertise on the instrument. In an interview in The Wire she explained, "the great thing about learning a new instrument from scratch is that it [...] liberates your imagination."

Vocally, she sang in a much higher register than usual, at a pitch outside her normal range, and "howled about being possessed by demon lovers and ghosts". Lyrically, Harvey continued with the dark, moody themes typical of much of her music.

In an interview with NME, Harvey elaborated the meaning behind the album's title: "I just like the sound of the words white chalk. It can be millions of years old but erased in a second, and somehow has a timeless quality... The timelessness became more the source of inspiration".

Reception

White Chalk received critical acclaim and has a score of 80 out of 100 on Metacritic. Uncut hailed the album in glowing terms, calling it "an album of lonely beauty and piercing sorrow" before concluding, "White Chalk is P.J. Harvey back at the peak of her considerable powers." The Observer gave the album 5 stars out of 5, while Robert Christgau picked out one song from the album, "When Under Ether", as a "choice cut".

In December 2007, American webzine Somewhere Cold voted White Chalk CD of the Year on their 2007 Somewhere Cold Awards Hall of Fame.

Accolades

Formats
The US release is available on CD and 33⅓ rpm LP. The UK release is available on CD and 45 rpm vinyl record. White Chalk is also available on iTunes complete with a bonus track, "Wait".

Track listing

Personnel
All personnel credits adapted from the album's liner notes.

Musicians
PJ Harvey – vocals, piano, acoustic guitar, bass, keyboards, zither, harmonica, harp, cigfiddle
John Parish – drums, bass guitar, acoustic guitar, banjo, percussion, backing vocals
Eric Drew Feldman – piano, keyboards, optigan, mellotron, minimoog, backing vocals 
Jim White – drums, percussion

Additional musicians
Nico Brown – concertina, backing vocals (on "Before Departure")
Andrew Dickson – backing vocals (on "Before Departure")
Bridget Pearse – backing vocals (on "Before Departure")
Martin Brunsden – backing vocals (on "Before Departure")
Nick Bicât – backing vocals (on "Before Departure")

Technical personnel
Flood – producer, engineer, mixing
John Parish – producer, mixing
PJ Harvey – producer, mixing, additional engineer
Catherine Marks – assistant engineer
Andrew Savors – assistant engineer
Ali Chant – additional engineer

Design personnel
Maria Mochnacz – artwork, photography
Rob Crane – artwork

Chart positions

Singles

Certifications and sales

References

External links
Free album sampler at PJHarvey.net
White Chalk at Musicbrainz

2007 albums
PJ Harvey albums
Albums produced by Flood (producer)
Island Records albums
Albums produced by John Parish
Chamber pop albums